The 2019 North Queensland Cowboys season was the 25th in the club's history. Coached by Paul Green and captained by Michael Morgan, they competed in the NRL's 2019 Telstra Premiership. Their first season since 2004 without club legend Johnathan Thurston, who retired at the end of 2018, the side finished 14th and missed the finals for the second straight year.

Season summary

Milestones
 Round 1: Jordan Kahu, Nene Macdonald, Josh McGuire and Tom Opacic made their debuts for the club.
 Round 1: Nene Macdonald scored his first try for the club.
 Round 2: Jordan Kahu scored his first try for the club.
 Round 4: The club played their 600th game.
 Round 4: Ben Hampton played his 50th game for the club.
 Round 4: Jordan McLean played his 100th NRL game.
 Round 5: Jordan Kahu played his 100th NRL game.
 Round 5: Kurt Baptiste made his debut for the club.
 Round 6: Josh McGuire played his 200th NRL game.
 Round 7: John Asiata played his 100th game for the club.
 Round 9: Tom Opacic scored his first try for the club.
 Round 10: Michael Morgan played his 150th game for the club.
 Round 10: Kyle Feldt played his 100th game for the club.
 Round 11: Justin O'Neill played his 100th game for the club.
 Round 13: Reuben Cotter made his NRL debut.
 Round 13: Francis Molo scored his first try in the NRL.
 Round 15: Scott Drinkwater made his debut for the club.
 Round 15: Scott Drinkwater scored his first try for the club.
 Round 17: Gavin Cooper played his 300th NRL game.
 Round 17: Jake Clifford scored his first try for the club.
 Round 18: Murray Taulagi made his NRL debut.
 Round 18: Paul Green coached his 150th NRL game.
 Round 21: Peter Hola made his NRL debut.
 Round 21: Shane Wright scored his first try in the NRL.
 Round 23: Murray Taulagi scored his first try in the NRL.
 Round 24: Shane Wright scored the final try at 1300SMILES Stadium.

Squad

Squad movement

Gains

Losses

Re-signings

Ladder

Fixtures

Pre-season

Regular season

Statistics

Representatives
The following players have played a representative match in 2019.

Honours

Club
Paul Bowman Medal: Jason Taumalolo
Players' Player: Jordan McLean
Coach's Award: Francis Molo
Member's Player of the Year: Jason Taumalolo
Club Person of the Year: Ben Hampton
Rookie of the Year: Shane Wright
Townsville Bulletin Fan's Choice Award: Kyle Feldt

Feeder Clubs

Queensland Cup
 Mackay Cutters - 11th, missed finals
 Northern Pride - 12th, missed finals
 Townsville Blackhawks - 4th, lost preliminary final

References

North Queensland Cowboys seasons
North Queensland Cowboys season